HarbourFront Centre, formerly World Trade Centre, is a shopping mall and ferry terminal in Singapore. The mall is part of a development known as HarbourFront.

History
Plans of building the World Trade Centre was first announced by the Port of Singapore Authority in 1973. It was officially opened in 1977, as well as having a ferry terminal that has traveling routes to nearby Indonesian ports, as well as the city of Batam and Bintan Island, it also featured nearby Expo Gateway and Harbour Pavilion exhibition halls.

The World Trade Centre hosted Miss Universe Pageant in 1987.

The World Trade Centre was later renovated from January 2000 with a connection to HarbourFront MRT station, and was reopened as HarbourFront Centre on 17 February 2003.

References

External links
 

Shopping malls in Singapore
Tourist attractions in Singapore
Buildings and structures completed in 1977
Bukit Merah
Shopping malls established in 1977
World Trade Centers
Buildings and structures in Central Region, Singapore
20th-century architecture in Singapore